Diego Lagos (born 5 March 1986 in Mar del Plata) is an Argentine football midfielder. He currently plays for Colón in the Argentine Primera División.

Titles

External links
 Argentine Primera statistics
 Diego Lagos at Soccerway

1986 births
Living people
Sportspeople from Mar del Plata
Argentine footballers
Argentina youth international footballers
Association football forwards
Argentine Primera División players
Liga MX players
Club Atlético Colón footballers
Club Atlético Lanús footballers
Instituto footballers
Rosario Central footballers
Club Universidad Nacional footballers
Aldosivi footballers
Argentine expatriate footballers
Expatriate footballers in Mexico